Abdelkareem Mohmmad Ahmad Khattab (born 4 August 1991) is a Jordanian Paralympic powerlifter. He won the gold medal in the men's 88 kg event at the 2020 Summer Paralympics held in Tokyo, Japan. He also set a new Paralympic record of 231 kg. A few months later, he won the gold medal in his event at the 2021 World Para Powerlifting Championships held in Tbilisi, Georgia. He also set a new world record of 250 kg.

Career

He competed in the men's 72 kg event at the 2016 Summer Paralympics held in Rio de Janeiro, Brazil without a successful lift. In 2017, he won the bronze medal in the men's 80 kg event at the World Para Powerlifting Championships held in Mexico City, Mexico. At the 2018 Asia-Oceania Open Powerlifting Championships held in Kitakyushu, Japan, he won the silver medal in his event.

At the 2019 World Para Powerlifting Championships held in Nur-Sultan, Kazakhstan, he won the bronze medal in the men's 88 kg event. A month before the 2020 Summer Paralympics, he won the gold medal in his event at the Dubai 2021 Para Powerlifting World Cup held in Dubai, United Arab Emirates. He also set a new world record of 237 kg in his third attempt which he then improved to 240 kg in his fourth lift. In December 2021, he set a new world record of 250 kg at the World Para Powerlifting Championships held in Tbilisi, Georgia.

Results

References

External links
 

Living people
1991 births
Jordanian powerlifters
Male powerlifters
Paralympic powerlifters of Jordan
Powerlifters at the 2016 Summer Paralympics
Powerlifters at the 2020 Summer Paralympics
Medalists at the 2020 Summer Paralympics
Paralympic gold medalists for Jordan
Paralympic medalists in powerlifting
People from Zarqa
20th-century Jordanian people
21st-century Jordanian people